Heli Rantanen (born 26 February 1970) is a retired Finnish track and field athlete who competed in the javelin throw. She was an Olympic Champion, having won gold in 1996. Her winning throw of 67.94 m was more than two metres ahead of the silver medalist. She was the first Nordic woman to become an Olympic Champion in athletics.

Achievements

References
  Sporting-heroes.net

1970 births
Living people
People from Hämeenlinna
Finnish female javelin throwers
Athletes (track and field) at the 1992 Summer Olympics
Athletes (track and field) at the 1996 Summer Olympics
Olympic athletes of Finland
Olympic gold medalists for Finland
Olympic gold medalists in athletics (track and field)
Medalists at the 1996 Summer Olympics
Sportspeople from Kanta-Häme